René Schiermeyer (born 27 September 1938 in Mulhouse) is a French former wrestler who competed in the 1960 Summer Olympics and in the 1964 Summer Olympics.

References

1938 births
Living people
Olympic wrestlers of France
Wrestlers at the 1960 Summer Olympics
Wrestlers at the 1964 Summer Olympics
French male sport wrestlers
Olympic bronze medalists for France
Olympic medalists in wrestling
Sportspeople from Mulhouse
Medalists at the 1960 Summer Olympics